Bala Rudkhaneh (also Romanized as Bālā Rūdkhāneh; also known as Bālā Rūd) is a village in Posht Rud Rural District, in the Central District of Narmashir County, Kerman Province, Iran. At the 2006 census, its population was 22, in five families.

References 

Populated places in Narmashir County